Silencer is the debut studio album by New Zealand rock band Zed. It was produced and engineered by David Nicholas at Revolver Studios in Auckland, New Zealand, with final overdubbing and mixing at Mangrove Studios, north of Sydney, Australia. Recording sessions were over in seven weeks, but not before all band members and production staff were struck by influenza.  The album was first released in New Zealand on 27 August 2000, via Universal Music Group. The album debuted at number one on the Official New Zealand Top 40 Albums chart, quickly achieving triple platinum status, and creating six hit singles. "Renegade Fighter" was also the number one song in New Zealand for the year 2000. In 2001, Silencer earned the band three wins at the New Zealand Music Awards including 'Album of the Year', 'Top Group', and 'Top Male Vocalist'. Early in 2001, a bonus disc edition with ten bonus tracks and the music videos for "Renegade Fighter," "Come On Down," and "Driver's Side" was made available.

Chart performance
Silencer debuted in the Official New Zealand Top 40 Albums chart on 27 August 2000 and peaked at number one.  The album spent a total of seventeen weeks on the chart in total, with the first nine weeks within the top ten. The album achieved triple platinum status in New Zealand and was the only number one local album for that year.

Track listing

Personnel
 Nathan King – vocals, guitars, composer
 Ben Campbell – bass, keyboards, fx, vocals, composer
 Andrew "Andy" Lynch – guitars, vocals, additional Pro Tools
 Adrian Palmer – drums, percussion, vocals, composer, additional Pro Tools
 David Nicholas – producer, engineering, mixing
 Nic Manders – assistant producer
 Blair Simmons - assistant producer
 Matt Lovell – assistant producer
 Pat Khutz – studio drum technician
 DJ Kritikl – scratching, loop (track 12)
 Don Bartley – mastering
 Grant Kearney – A&R
 Seven.co.nz – design and artwork
 Chris Tate – recording, mixing, editing, mastering (live tracks)
 Tom Muskin – editing, mastering (live tracks)

Credits for Silencer adapted from liner notes.

References

2000 debut albums
Zed (band) albums